The 1919 South American Championships in Athletics was the inaugural South American Championships and was contested by Uruguay and Chile were held in Montevideo, Uruguay between 11 and 13 April.

Medal summary

Men's events

Medal table

External links 
 Men Results – GBR Athletics
 Women Results – GBR Athletics

S
South American Championships in Athletics
A
1919 in South American sport
1919 in Uruguayan sport